The 2022 Indiana's 2nd congressional district special election was a special election to choose a new member of the U.S. House of Representatives. The seat became vacant after incumbent Congresswoman Jackie Walorski died in a traffic collision on August 3, 2022.

In accordance with Title 3, Article 10, of the Indiana Code, a special election must be held for any U.S. House vacancy that occurs more than 74 days before the next general election. On August 9, Governor Eric Holcomb announced the special election was to be held concurrently with the general election on November 8. Parties held caucuses to nominate their candidates for the election; they had until August 26 to do so.

Since the congressional district boundaries set in the 2020 redistricting cycle go into effect on January 3, 2023, the special election was conducted under the old district lines whereas the regular election on the same date was conducted under the new district lines.

Republican caucus 
The Indiana Republican Party held its nominating caucus in Mishawaka on August 20. Out of approximately 500 precinct committee members who were eligible to vote, about 375 were present at the caucus. The number of votes received by each candidate was not made public; Indiana Republican Party chair Kyle Hupfer said in a statement that Rudy Yakym received a majority of votes in the first round of balloting and was thus selected to replace Walorski as the Republican nominee in the 2022 regular election. Subsequently, Yakym also won the nomination for the special election by voice vote.

Candidates

Nominee 
Rudy Yakym, supply chain management executive and former finance director for Jackie Walorski

Eliminated at convention 
Dallas Barkman
Terry Harper III
Curtis Hill, former attorney general of Indiana
Michael Hogberg, enrolled agent and tax preparer
Scott Alan Huffman
Tiernan Kane, attorney
Daniel Koors
Marvin Joe Layne
Curt Nisly, state representative from the 22nd district
Christy Stutzman, former state representative from the 49th district and wife of former U.S. Representative Marlin Stutzman
Scott Wise

Did not file 
Mick Hoeflinger
Michael Nidiffer

Declined 
Dean Swihart, Jackie Walorski's widower (endorsed Yakym)

Endorsements

Democratic caucus 
The Indiana Democratic Party held its nominating caucus in Lakeville on August 23.

Candidates

Nominee 
 Paul Steury, environmental consultant and nominee for this district in the 2022 regular election

Libertarian caucus

Candidates

Nominee 
 William Henry, nominee for this district in the 2022 regular election

General election

Endorsements

Results

See also 
2022 United States House of Representatives elections
2022 United States elections
117th United States Congress
List of special elections to the United States House of Representatives

References

External links 
Official campaign websites
 Paul Steury (D) for Congress
 Rudy Yakym (R) for Congress

United States House of Representatives 02 special
Indiana 02 special
United States House of Representatives 2022 02
Indiana 2022 02
2022 02 special
Indiana 2022 02